Süleyman Çelebi (1351 - 1422 AD) (pronounced Sulaiman Chalabi), imam of the Grand Mosque of Bursa during the Ottoman Empire, was a mystic and author of Wasilat al-Najat, his only known work, the first and most famous of the Turkish-written mawlids, the nativity of the Prophet Muhammad. The work is commonly known as the Mevlidi Sherif - Süleyman Çelebi. Sulaiman Chalabi was born sometime between 1346-1351 and his death date is 1422 AD.

Biography 
He was born in the period of Orhan Gazi. According to some sources, he is the son of Ahmed Pasha, one of the viziers of the Ottoman Sultan Murad I, and the grandson of Sheikh Mahmud Efendi. His grandfather, aka Mahmud Bey, is the grandson of Sheikh Edebali and was one of those who sailed to Rumelia in 1338 under the leadership of Süleyman Pasha, son of Orhan.

He received a good education in Bursa in his youth. At that time, the title of "Çelebi" was given to scholars and the elders of the Mevlevi Order. However, there is no evidence that he was a Mevlevi. He attracted the attention of Sultan Bayezid I with his knowledgeable attitude and was appointed as the imam of the Grand Mosque, whose construction was completed in 1399. He wrote his famous work Vesiletü'n Necat having been influenced by a mystical experience he had during this mission.

According to legend, Süleyman Çelebi resented an Iranian preacher who said that Muhammad was not much different from other prophets and wrote his mawlid to express that he was superior to other prophets. During the Ottoman Interregnum, which was a weak phase of the Ottoman Empire and all kinds of turmoil prevailed in the Anatolian lands, Süleyman Çelebi was on the side of the Ahl as-Sunnah in the conflict between Batiniyya esoteric views and Sunnis. For this reason, it is stated that one of the reasons for writing the mawlid was to support the followers of the Ahl as-Sunnah. He completed his work in 1409 (approximately at the age of 60). While writing his work, the works he referenced were determined to be Âşık Paşa's Garibname, Erzurumlu Darir's Siyerü'n Nebi, Eb'ul Hasan Bekri's Siyer and Muhyiddin Ibn al-Arabi's Fusus.

The tomb of Süleyman Çelebi is on Çekirge Road in Bursa.

See also 
 List of Turkish Mawlid texts

Notes

References 

1422 deaths
1351 births
Poets from the Ottoman Empire
Turkish poets
Mawlid
Imams
People from Bursa
14th-century Muslim theologians
15th-century Muslim theologians
Islamic scholars from the Ottoman Empire